Facundo Piñero (born 26 September 1988) is an Argentinian basketball player for Regatas Corrientes of the Argentine Basketball League.

Career
In 2015, Piñero played for La Unión de Formosa.

On 13 July 2019, Piñero signed with defending Argentine champions San Lorenzo.

References 

1988 births
Living people
Argentine men's basketball players
Fuerza Regia de Monterrey players
Centers (basketball)
San Lorenzo de Almagro (basketball) players
Instituto ACC basketball players
La Unión basketball players
Sportspeople from Mar del Plata